Ted Ryan may refer to:

 Ted Ryan (footballer, born 1921), Australian rules footballer for Collingwood
 Ted Ryan (footballer, born 1925), Australian rules footballer for Footscray
 Ted Ryan (rower) (born 1957), Irish Olympic rower

See also
Edward Ryan (disambiguation)